Martin Rucker may refer to:
Martin T. Rucker (born 1957), member of the Missouri House of Representatives
Martin Rucker (American football) (born 1985), American football tight end